Larry Bwalya (born 29 May 1995) is a Zambian footballer who plays as a midfielder for Simba and the Zambia national football team.

Bwalya signed with Simba S.C. on 15 August 2020 on a three-year deal. The central midfielder has appeared in two matches during the 2020–21 CAF Champions League competition, starting matches against F.C. Platinum on 6 Jan 2021, and in the opening group stage match against AS Vita Club.

International goals

References

External links

Profile at Football Database

1995 births
Living people
Zanaco F.C. players
Power Dynamos F.C. players
Zambian footballers
Zambia international footballers
Association football midfielders
Zambia under-20 international footballers
Simba S.C. players
Zambia Super League players
Zambian expatriate sportspeople in Tanzania
Tanzanian Premier League players
Zambia A' international footballers
2018 African Nations Championship players